The Garda Water Unit is a unit of the Garda Síochána, the police service of Ireland. Formerly known as the Garda Sub-Aqua Unit, the name was changed to incorporate the services of the non-diving surfaced based marine section.

It is part of the Operational Support Units which provides specialist support to Gardaí nationwide. The Operational Support Units also includes the Dog Support, Mounted Support and Air Support .

Operations
The Water Unit exists to assist the Garda Síochána in both diving and surface operations. Diving operations include searching for and recovery of missing persons and evidence, conducting security searches in water and in confined spaces e.g. sewers. The unit also conduct surface patrols which encompass maritime safety, maritime legislation enforcement and security patrols.

The approximate strength of the unit is three sergeants and fourteen officers, who cover the entire jurisdiction of the Republic of Ireland. The unit operate out of Santry Garda Station, Dublin, and Athlone Garda Station, Westmeath.

Training
The environments where the Garda Water Unit members carry out their duties are potentially life-threatening. Training of team members is thorough and on-going. Members must successfully complete courses in the following areas:
Breathing Apparatus and Escape sets (Confined Space Searches)
ISA Advanced Powerboat Coxswain
Firearms familiarisation & safe handling
Evidence handling & recovery
Garda Driving courses

Members can further specialise in: dive supervision, underwater photography, climbing & rope skills, equipment servicing, and Sonar operating.

Equipment

The Garda Water Unit employ a mixture of fifteen different types of water-borne vessels, mostly inflatable boats. Two however are river-going vessels used for inland patrols.

Inter-agency operations
The Garda Water Unit cross-trains with the other Garda Operational Support Units. It also carries out operations and exercises with a number of agencies such as the Irish Coastguard, the Irish Customs Service, the Irish Naval Service (NSDS), the Fire Brigade and the Civil Defence. 
This type of multi-agency training improves operational skills and provides an opportunity to improve response times and capabilities.

References

External links
Official site

Water Unit
Maritime law enforcement agencies